The 1913 Paris–Roubaix was the 18th edition of the Paris–Roubaix, a classic one-day cycle race in France. The single day event was held on 23 March 1913 and stretched  from Paris to its end in a velodrome in Roubaix. The winner was François Faber from Luxembourg.

Results

References

Paris–Roubaix
Paris-Roubaix
Paris-Roubaix
Paris-Roubaix